Ewarton Airstrip  is an airstrip serving the town of Ewarton and the WINDALCO bauxite mine in the Saint Catherine Parish of Jamaica.

There is distant rising terrain to the northwest.

See also

Transport in Jamaica
List of airports in Jamaica

References

External links
OpenStreetMap - Ewarton
HERE Maps - Ewarton Airstrip

Airports in Jamaica